Silence (Silence Records AB), is a Swedish record company located outside Koppom, Värmland in Sweden.

Silence was started in 1970 in Stockholm and released records by, amongst others: Bo Hansson, Philemon Arthur and the Dung, Samla Mammas Manna, and other progressive rock acts.  In 1977, Silence moved to a new studio in Värmland, in a converted school, where artists and bands like Twice a Man, Ebba Grön, Dag Vag, Hellacopters, Eldkvarn, and Kent recorded several albums. Some notable artists currently signed to Silence are Bob Hund, Sci-Fi SKANE, and Fint Tillsammans.

Silence is also one of the larger record labels included in the Svenska oberoende musikproducenter (Swedish independent music producers).

See also
 List of record labels

External links
Silence official homepage

Swedish independent record labels
Record labels established in 1970
Progressive rock record labels